Gary Alan Haugen (born April 16, 1963) is an American attorney who is the Founder, CEO, and former President of International Justice Mission, a global organization that protects the poor from violence throughout the developing world.  International Justice Mission partners with local authorities to rescue victims of violence, bring criminals to justice, restore survivors, and strengthen justice systems.  Haugen founded the organization in 1999.

Education 
Haugen graduated magna cum laude from Harvard College in 1985 with a B.A. in social studies. He earned a J.D. from the University of Chicago Law School, cum laude, where he was the Ford Foundation Scholar in International Law and a Tony Patino Fellow. Haugen also served as a visiting scholar in politics at the University of Adelaide in Australia.

Career before International Justice Mission 

In the mid-1980s, Haugen served on the executive committee of the National Initiative for Reconciliation in South Africa. Chaired by then-Bishop Desmond Tutu and Michael Cassidy of African Enterprise, the NIR consisted of Christian leaders proactively devoted to political reform and racial reconciliation.

Upon his departure from South Africa, Haugen began work for the Lawyers Committee for Human Rights, based in New York City. In the late 1980s, Haugen conducted a structural examination of the Philippine government's prosecution of human rights abuses committed by its military and police. Haugen investigated multiple murders and other violent abuses by the Philippine military and police, and participated in the exhumations of victims and the provision of protection services for witnesses. In analysis of his investigations, Haugen authored a book published by the Lawyers Committee entitled Impunity: Human Rights Prosecutions in the Philippines.

After working with the Lawyers Committee, Haugen began a career with the United States Department of Justice. In 1994, Haugen was put on loan from the Department of Justice to the United Nation's Center for Human Rights to serve as Officer In Charge of its genocide investigation in Rwanda. In this capacity, Haugen directed an international team of lawyers in the gathering of evidence against the perpetrators of the Rwandan genocide. Haugen developed the investigative strategy, protocols and field methodology for gathering eye-witness testimony and physical evidence from nearly 100 mass grave and massacre sites across Rwanda. Haugen personally conducted and directed field investigations at various sites.

Until April 1997, when he left the Department of Justice to found International Justice Mission, Haugen worked as a senior trial attorney with the Police Misconduct Task Force of the Civil Rights Division of the U.S. Department of Justice, where he worked on police misconduct cases, and on cases involving various forms of human rights abuses. When Congress granted the Attorney General new authority to pursue enforcement action against police departments with patterns or practices of misconduct, Haugen was selected to serve on a small task force with national enforcement authority.

Haugen currently serves on the Human Rights Executive Directors Working Group, the Board of the Overseers of the Berkeley Journal of International Law, and the World Economic Forum Global Agenda Council on Justice.

The Locust Effect

In his 2014 book, The Locust Effect: Why the End of Poverty Requires the End of Violence (Oxford University Press) Haugen introduces and defines the term "The Locust Effect" referring to the all-encompassing and devastating effects of common, ordinary violence on the lives of the poor. From the book: “Beneath the surface of the world's poorest communities, common violence – like rape, forced labor, illegal detention, land theft, police abuse and other brutality – has become routine and relentless. And like a horde of locusts devouring everything in their path, the unchecked plague of violence ruins lives, blocks the road out of poverty, and undercuts development.”

Former U.S. President Bill Clinton endorsed the book, saying that "The Locust Effect is a compelling reminder that if we are to create a 21st Century of shared prosperity, we cannot turn a blind eye to the violence that threatens our common humanity."

Other endorsers include Former U.S. Secretary of State Madeleine Albright, Nobel Laureate and Founder of Grameen Bank Muhammad Yunus, Founding President for the Center of Global Development Nancy Birdsall, Founder and Executive Chairman of World Economic Forum Klaus Schwab, President of Oxfam America Ray Offenheiser, President and CEO of CARE Helene Gayle, Google Giving Director Jacquelline Fuller, Redeemer Presbyterian Church Pastor Tim Keller, Chief Executive of World Vision Australia Tim Costello, and others.

Christian faith
Haugen is an engaged Christian. He is a member of the Anglican Church in North America, and spoke at their General Convention in 2014. Since founding International Justice Mission in 1997, he has described witnessing a "sea change" within the "Christian community that was [once] largely disengaged from the struggle for justice in the world," but now views care for victims of injustice as a significant issue in faith. Inspired by the work of historical leaders such as Martin Luther King, Jr. and Mother Teresa as well as contemporary Christians in seeking justice for the oppressed, Haugen founded IJM on the principle of Isaiah 1:17 ("Learn to do good; seek justice, rescue the oppressed, defend the orphan, plead for the widow." NRSV). Though it is a faith-based organization, IJM protects the poor from violence without regard to religion, race or any other factor, and they seek to partner with all people of goodwill.

Media, public appearances, and awards 
In 2012, Gary was honored by the U.S. State Department as a Trafficking in Persons "Hero" – the highest honor given by the U.S. government for anti-slavery leadership. In 2007, Haugen was awarded the Wilberforce Forum Award, an annual award presented by Prison Fellowship that recognizes an individual who has made a difference in the face of formidable societal problems and injustices.

Haugen has spoken at numerous venues around the world including Harvard University, Yale Law School, Berkeley School of Law, Pepperdine University,  Stanford University, The University of Chicago Schwartz Lecture, The World Economic Forum, The World Bank, The Clinton Global Initiative, Willowcreek Leadership Summit, Passion Conference, and TED2015. In 2009–2010, Haugen taught a course at the University of Chicago Law School on Human Rights and Rule of Law in the Developing World.

In February 2002, Haugen hosted a policy briefing on international sex trafficking with U.S. Secretary of State Madeleine Albright in conjunction with the events of the Reebok Human Rights Award. In November 2005, Haugen moderated a panel on human trafficking between Senators Sam Brownback (R-KS) and Hillary Clinton (D-NY.) In 2015, Haugen testified before the Senate Foreign Relations Committee at a hearing entitled "Ending Modern Slavery: What is the Best Way Forward?"

Haugen and the work of IJM have been featured by Dateline NBC, The Oprah Winfrey Show, NPR, 60 Minutes II, The Today Show, Dateline NBC, NBC Nightly News, CNN, MSNBC, Fox News, BBC World News, The New York Times, The Wall Street Journal, Forbes magazine, Need Magazine, Foreign Affairs, Christianity Today, The New Yorker, and The New York Times Magazine.

Haugen was also featured in Harvard Magazine and in the University of Chicago School of Law's magazine, The Record. Haugen has authored numerous articles on foreign affairs, international law and human rights.

In 2010, U.S. News & World Report  named IJM one of the top 10 service groups making a difference in the world, describing IJM as an example of "noteworthy public service programs that are having an impact."

In 2019, Haugen received an honorary degree from Wake Forest University. He was also the keynote speaker at the Baccalaureate service for Wake Forest's commencement in 2019.

Books 
In 2014, Haugen and co-author Victor Boutros published The Locust Effect: Why the End of Poverty Requires the End of Violence (2014).

Previous works include:
 Good News About Injustice (1999)
 Terrify No More (2005), highlights the removal of elementary-age girls from brothels.
 Just Courage  (2008)
 Good News About Injustice, 10th Anniversary Edition (2009)

References

External links
 

1960s births
Living people
American Anglican Church in North America members
American officials of the United Nations
20th-century American lawyers
American human rights activists
American evangelicals
Harvard College alumni
University of Chicago Law School alumni
University of Chicago alumni
American chief executives